Uladzimir Iosifavich Mihurski (Vladimir Iosifovich Migurskiy; born 13 June 1968) is a former Belarusian football player.

Honours
Torpedo Mogilev
Belarusian Cup finalist: 1995

References

1968 births
Living people
Soviet footballers
Association football defenders
FC Dnepr Mogilev players
FC Zorya Luhansk players
FC Lokomotiv Nizhny Novgorod players
Belarusian footballers
Belarusian expatriate footballers
Expatriate footballers in Russia
Russian Premier League players
FC Torpedo Mogilev players
Expatriate footballers in Kuwait
FC Transmash Mogilev players
Al-Yarmouk SC (Kuwait) players
Belarusian expatriate sportspeople in Kuwait
Belarusian expatriate sportspeople in Russia
People from Mogilev
Sportspeople from Mogilev Region